Oesman Sadik Airport is an airport in Labuha, the capital city of South Halmahera Regency, North Maluku, Indonesia .

Airlines and destinations

Statistic

References 

  Dirjen Perhubungan Udara

External links 
Oesman Sadik Airport - Indonesia Airport global website

Airports in North Maluku